The German large, or ocean-going, torpedo boats and destroyers of World War I were built by the Imperial German Navy between 1899 and 1918 as part of its quest for a “High Seas” or ocean-going fleet. At the start of the First World War Germany had 132 such ships, and ordered a further 216 during the conflict, 112 of which were actually completed. Of these, 55 were lost during the war, 50 were interned on 23 November 1918 under the terms of the Armistice, and subsequently scuttled at Scapa Flow on 21 June 1919. Of the survivors, 32 were included in the post-war Germany navy (some surviving to see service as auxiliaries in the Second World War), 36 were surrendered to Allied powers in 1920, and the remainder were scrapped in 1921.

Designation
Officially they were called "large torpedo-boats" (Große Torpedoboote) or "ocean-going torpedo-boats" (Hochseetorpedoboote), they were in many ways the equivalent of the contemporary destroyers in other navies (and were often referred to as such by their crews). The Imperial German Navy also had a number of vessels  officially designated  "destroyers" (Zerstörer), but numbered sequentially as torpedo-boats. These were, primarily, vessels under construction for foreign navies and taken over at the outbreak of the First World War.

Background
The first German Naval Law of 1898 legislated the construction of an ocean-going battle fleet by Imperial Germany. To accompany the squadrons of battleships and cruisers, the law called for the construction of flotillas of considerably larger, better armed and more seaworthy than the previous torpedo boats built by Germany.
Although they were initially given numbers in the same series as the smaller torpedo-boats, they were separated in 1911, with the large torpedo boats numbered from SMS V1, and the older vessels re-numbered with a 'T-'prefix. During the next 20 years a total of 336 such vessels were ordered for the German navy; these vessels are listed in this article.

General remarks

Programs
The German Navy's strength during the years prior to the outbreak of the First World War was mandated by a series of acts of the Reichstag, which prescribed the numbers of ships constituting the fleet, as well as age at which these ships should be replaced.
The original 1898 Naval Law called for a force 19 Battleships (in two battle squadrons), 8 Armored Coastal Defense Vessels (forming a third battle squadron), 12 large and 30 small cruisers, supported by six flotillas of Ocean-going torpedo boats (two flotillas each for the three battle squadrons). Each flotilla consisted of 12 vessels, or 72 in total. Admiral Tirpitz, the originator of this law, called for these vessels to be large enough to cope with rough seas, but small enough to be commanded by a single officer (due to the man-power constraints of the German Navy at that time).

The 1900 Naval Law, which provided for a major expansion of the German Navy (in reaction to the growing antipathy towards Great Britain provoked by the outbreak of the Boer War) expanded the torpedo-boat force to 144 vessels, half in commission, half in reserve with 60% nucleus crews. From 1898 until 1905, torpedo boats were ordered at a rate of 6 per year.

The total number of torpedo boats remained the same under the 1906 Law, although the number in commission increased to 99, with 45 in material reserve. Older vessels were to be replaced after 12 years of service, so that the annual rate of construction increased to 12 vessels in 1906 and subsequent years.

Following the outbreak of war in August 1914, 48 new vessels of the latest design were quickly ordered.  This was augmented in the following weeks by seizures of vessels and machinery under manufacture in Germany for foreign powers, resulting in the addition of 4 small and 12 extra-large torpedo boats (the later group officially being designated destroyers).  More orders were placed in 1916 and later years, although the deteriorating war situation of Germany meant that only a portion of these vessels were ever completed.

Designations and builders
As was common with other naval powers, the Germany Admiralty gave broad specifications for the vessels they ordered but allowed shipbuilders considerable latitude in the detail designs, with the result that there were various minor differences between vessels, even between vessels ordered in the same year.  German torpedo-boats were not given names, but were numbered in a sequential series, with an initial letter to denote the builder:

Comparison with foreign vessels
Germany's main naval adversary of this period was Great Britain.  Generally speaking, German large torpedo-boats tended to be slightly smaller than contemporary British destroyers, with lighter gun armament but heavier torpedo armament.  Germany favored a well-deck forward of the bridge, mounting torpedo tubes, with a short fo'c'sle mounting a single gun; the freeboard was kept small in order to reduce the silhouette (so that the vessel would be more difficult for an adversary to spot); these features made fighting in rough weather difficult, and in later designs the well-deck was deleted and the fo'c'sle extended. Germany was slower than Britain in adopting new propulsion technologies such as steam turbines, oil fuel and geared turbines.

Type 1898 

1898 Program
 length: 62.7 m (205 ft 8 in) water-line, 63.0 m (206 ft 8 in) over-all; beam: 7.0 m (23 ft); draft: 2.83 m (9 ft 3 inches) deep load
 Displacement: 310 tons normal, 394 tons full
 Machinery: triple expansion engines driving two propellers, 5900 HP (4.4 MW); speed: 27 knots (50 km/h); 93 tons coal; Range : 830 nautical miles at 17 knots
 Crew: 57 men
 Weapons: three 5 cm SK L/40 (2") guns in single mountings; three 45 cm (18") torpedo tubes, single center-line mountings (one in well-deck forward of the bridge, two others amidships).

1899 Program

1900 Program

1901 Program

1902 Program

1903 Program

1904 Program

1905 Program

Type 1906 

1906 Program (II Flotilla)

1907 Program (VI Flotilla)

1908 Program (III Flotilla)

1909 Program (VIII Flotilla)

1910 Program (I Flotilla)

1910 supplementary order
Replacements for the four vessels sold to Turkey in 1910.

Type 1911 

1911 Program (V Flotilla)
On completion, these vessels formed the V Torpedo Boat Flotilla of the High Seas Fleet.

1912 Program (VII Flotilla)
On completion, these vessels formed the VII Torpedo Boat Flotilla of the High Seas Fleet.

1912 Supplementary order
Replacements for the two vessels sold to Greece in 1912.

Type 1913 

1913 Program (IX Flotilla)
Ordered 1 Apr 1913.  On completion, most of these vessels joined the IX Torpedo Boat Flotilla of the High Seas Fleet.

1914 Program (VI Flotilla)
The last pre-war Flotilla, ordered 22 Apr 1914.  On completion, most of these vessels joined the VI Torpedo Boat Flotilla of the High Seas Fleet, (replacing V 151-V 161).

Mobilization Program
48 vessels ordered 6 Aug 1914 as part of the mobilization of the German armed forces for the First World War.  The first two, S 49 and S 50 had been originally projected as replacements for S35 and S 36, which were sold to Greece in April 1914.

Destroyers (Zerstörer) 

Mobilization Program (Aug 1914)

Four vessels ordered on 7 Aug 1914 and 10 Aug 1914 to make use of machinery sets constructed in Germany for the Russian Orfey-class destroyers Leitenant Ilin, Kapitan Konon-Zotov, Gavriil and Michail.

October 1914 order

ex-Argentinian vessels

Requisitioned 15 Aug 1914.

ex-Netherlands torpedoboats
Designed and built as Z1 – Z4 for the Netherlands, seized 10 Aug 1914.

Type 1916
Apr 1916 Program

1916 Mobilization Type 

June 1916 Program

Nov 1916 Program

1917 Program
Total: 22 vessels (none completed).

1918 Mobilization Type
The final First World War-era German torpedo boat design were large (1,268 tons) vessels with geared turbines and a heavy armament (4-105mm guns and 6–50 cm torpedo tubes).

Jan 1918 Program
V 170-V 177, S 178-S 185 and H 186-H 193 (24 vessels in total; none completed).  None had been launched by the time of the armistice, after which all contracts were cancelled.

Jun 1918 Program
H 194-H 202, V 203-V 210 and S 211-S 223 (30 vessels in total, none completed). None of these proceeded further than a very preliminary stage of construction; all were cancelled after the armistice.

Tactical organization
As an indication of the employment of the Imperial German Navy's large torpedo boats, the following provide skeleton orders of battle for these vessels at various dates during the First World War. The basic tactical unit was the Torpedo-Boat Flotilla, consisting of two half-flotillas (typically five vessels each) plus one vessel for the flotilla commander.

Mid-October 1914
This list shows the dispositions early in the war, after mobilization was complete 
High Seas Fleet
I. TBF: V 191 (leader); 1. hf: V 186, V 190, V 188, G 197, V 189; 2. hf: G 196, G 193, G 195, G 192, G 194
II. TBF: S 149 (leader); 3. hf: S 138, S 139, S 141, S 140, S 142; 4. hf: S 144, S 145, S 147, S 146, S 148
III. TBF: S 167 (leader); 5. hf: V 162, V 163, V 164, S 165, S 166; 6. hf: G 173, G 169, G 172, G 170, S 168
IV. TBF: T 113 (leader); 7. hf: S 119, S 122, S 117, S 118, S 115; 8. hf: S 128, T 111, S 129, S 126, T 110
V. TBF: G 12 (leader); 9. hf: V 6, V 1, V 3, V 4, V 5; 10. hf: G 11, G 9, G 7, G 8, G 10
VI. TBF: V 150 (leader); 11. hf: V 151, V 153, V 154, V 152, V 155; 12. hf: V 156, V 157, V 159, V 158, V 160
VII. TBF: S 24 (leader); 13. hf: S 14, S 15, S 13, S 16, S 18; 14. hf: S 19, S 21, S 23, S 20, S 22
VIII. TBF: G 174 (leader); 15. hf: V 181, V 183, V 182, S 130, S 131; 16. hf: S 176, S 177, S 179, V 180, G 175
IX. TBF: S 28 (leader); 17. hf: V 25, V 26, V 27, S 31, S 32; 18. hf: V 30, V 29, S 33, S 34, S 35, S 36
tenders to U-Boat Flotillas: T 109, T 99, T 100, T 101
fleet tenders (attached to fleet flagship, battle Squadrons etc.): T 98, T 96

Other areas
Baltic: 19. hf: S 120, G 134, S 124, S 127, T 97; 20. hf: G 133, G 132, G 135, G 136
Coastal Defense: Jade/Weser Division : T 91, T 93, T 94, T 95, T 107; Elbe Division: S 114
East Asia: S 90

May 1916
The following list of front line torpedo boats reflects the situation immediately prior to the Battle of Jutland.
High Seas Fleet
I. TBF: S 32 (leader); 1. hf: G 39, G 40, G 38, V 190, G 197; 2. hf: G 192, G 195, G 196, G 193
II. TBF: B 98 (leader); 3. hf: G 101, G 102, B 112, B 97; 4. hf: B 109, B 110, B 111, G 103, G 104
III. TBF: S 53 (leader); 5. hf: V 71, V 73, V 74, G 88, G 85; 6. hf: V 48, V 70, S 55, S 54, G 42
V. TBF: G 11 (leader); 9. hf: V 6, V 2, V 3, V 1, V 4; 10. hf: G 8, G 7, V 5, G 9, G 10
VI. TBF: G 41 (leader); 11. hf: V 44, S 49, V 43, G 87, G 86; 12. hf: V 69, S 50, V 46, V 45, G 37 
VII. TBF: S 24 (leader); 13. hf: S 15, S 17, S 20, S 16, S 18; 14. hf: S 19, S 23, V 186, V 189
IX. TBF: V 28 (leader); 17. hf: V 27, V 26, S 36, S51, S 52; 18. hf: V 30, S 34, S 33, V 29, S 35

Baltic
VI. Scouting Group: V 100
IV. TBF: V 160 (leader); 7. hf: V 154, G 133, S 140, S 143, S 145, V 151, V 152, V 155, V 157, V 158, V 161 
VIII. TBF: S 178 (leader); 15. hf: V 183, V 182, V 181, V 185, V 184; 16. hf: S 176, V 180, G 174, S 179, G 175
X. TBF: S 56 (leader); 19. hf: V 78, S 143, S 148, S 147, S 139; 20. hf: V 72, V 75, S 57, G 89, V 77
attached: T 107, S 146; 21. hf: S 167, G 169, G 170, S 168, G 137.

Flanders
Destroyer Flotilla:  hf Cleve: V 67, V 68, V 47

Auxiliary service
Minesweeper flotillas: T 103, S 149, G 136, T 104
North Sea patrol flotillas: S 127, S 128; coastal defence: T 93, S 131, T 110, T 106, T 97, T 105, G 135, T 112, T 113, S 114, S 120, S 138
Tenders to U-Boat flotillas: T 159, T 99, G 137, T 101, G 132; fleet tenders: T 96, T 98
Training: G 134, S 126, S 122, S 121, S 131, V106, V 108, T 102, T 108, V 105, S 130, S 125

April 1918
The following is the situation in the North Sea at the end of April 1918, at the time of the last offensive sortie of the High Seas Fleet.

High Seas Fleet
I. TBF:  V 129 (leader); 1. hf: G 39, G 38, G 40, G 86, S 32; 2. hf: V 130, S 135, S 133, S 134, S 139
II. TBF:  B 97 (leader); 3. hf: G 101, G 103, V 100, G 104, G 102; 4. hf: B 109, B 110, B 112, B 98, B 111
V. TBF:  G 11 (leader); 9. hf: V 6, S 23, V 3, V 2, V 1, T 196, T 197; 10. hf: G 8, V 5, G 10, G 7, G 9, T 183, T 181
VI. TBF:  V 128 (leader); 11. hf: V 127, V 126, S 131, V 125, S 132; 12. hf: V 43, V 45, S 50, S 49, V 46, V 44
VII. TBF:  S 62 (leader); 13. hf: V 78, S 65, S 66, V 83, S 56; 14. hf: T 182, G 92, G 89 (G 87, G 93, G 94 were all sunk 30 Mar 1918)
VIII. TBF:  T 180 (leader) ; 15. hf: T 193, T 195, T 192, T 189, T 190; 16. hf: T 176, T 178, T 174, T 179, T 186
IX. TBF:  V 78 (leader); 17. hf: V 80, S 52, S 51, S 60,  S 36; 18. hf: V 30, V 26, V 28, S 34, S 33
Serving with Mine-sweeping Flotillas: T 103, T 184, T 149, T 132
I. GF; 1. hf: T 127, T 114, T 109, T 101, T 125, T 112, T 99, T 106, T 102, T 105, T 93; 2. hf: T 185, S 19, S 24, T 122, T 148, S 18, T 135, T 147, T 131, T 196, T 197; 3. hf: T 136, T 92, T 104, T 128, T 138, T 97
II. GF: T 128; 5. hf: T 99; 6. hf: T 97; 7. hf: T 125; 8. hf: T 114; 9. hf: T 102; 10. hf: T 92, T 128; (T 103 repairing)

September 1918
The following is the disposition of all of Germany's ocean-going torpedo boats shortly before the end of the war.

High Seas Fleet
I. TBF:  1. hf: V 129, S 32, G 38, G 39, G 40, G 86; 2. hf: V 130, S 134, S 133, S 135, S 139
II. TBF:  3. hf: B 98, G 101, G 102, G 103, G 104, V 100; 4. hf: B 97, B 109, B 110, B 111, B 112
V. TBF:  9. hf: G 11, V 1, V 2, V 3, V 6, S 23; 10. hf: V 5, G 7, G 8, G 10
VI. TBF:  11. hf: V 128, V 125, V 126, V 127, S 131, S 132; 12. hf: V 43, V 44, V 45, V 46, S 49, S 50
VII. TBF: (V 116 to join); 13. hf: V 83, V 78, S 65, S 56 (S 138 to join); 14. hf: G 92, G 89 (S 136, S 137, H145 to join)
VIII. TBF:  15. hf: T 180, T 189, T 190, T 193, T 195; 16. hf: T 174, T 176, T 178, T 179, T 186
IX. TBF:  17. hf: V 79, S 36, S 51, S 52, S 60, V 80; 18. hf: V 26, V 28, V 30, S 33, S 34
I. GF: 1. hf: T 127, T 109, T 112, T 93, T 170, T 165, T 182, T 183, T 181; 2. hf: T 185, S 19, S 24, T 122, T 148, T 113, S 18, T 135, T 147, T 131, T 197, T 196; 3. hf: T 136, T 169 (plus twelve "A" Boats)
II. GF: 5. hf: T 99; 6. hf: T 97; 7. hf: T 125; 8. hf: T 114; 9. hf: T 102; 10. hf: T 92, T 128; (T 103 repairing)
Serving with Mine-sweeping Flotillas: T 184, T 132, T 96, T 98

Baltic
IV. TBF:  7. hf: T 160, T 133, T 139, T 140, T 143, T 145, T 151, T 152, T 154; 19. hf: T 155, T 157, T 158, T 104, T 106, T 175, T 101, T 105

Flanders
III. TBF:  5. hf: V 71, S 53, V 73, V 81, G 41, V 77; 6. hf: S 54, S 55, V 70, G 91
Flanders Destroyer Flotilla: 1. hf: V 47, V 67, G 95, S 61; 2. hf: S 63, V 69, V 82
out of service: S 15, V 74

Auxiliary service
Baltic Training Flotilla: 1. hf: T 173, T 166, T 134, V 108, T 107; 2. hf: T 167, T 163, T 142, T 126
Gunnery training: T 144, T 146, T 168, V 105
Mine warfare vessels: V 106, T 110, T 120
Tenders to U-boat flotillas: T 130, T 137, T 153, T 159, T 161, T 164, T 108, T 121
Fleet tenders, etc.: T 91, T 94, T 95, T 111, T 156, T 141.

See also 
English language
 High Seas Fleet
 Order of battle at Jutland
 Scuttling of the German fleet in Scapa Flow
 Small torpedo boats of World War I (S 7-class, S 66-class, G 88 & G 89)
 A-class torpedo boat (coastal torpedo boats)

German language
 Großes Torpedoboot (Large Torpedo-Boats)
 Liste deutscher Großer Torpedoboote (1898–1919)  (List of German Large Torpedo-Boats (1898–1919))
 Liste deutscher Torpedoboote (1898–1919) (List of German Torpedo-Boats (1898–1919))
 Liste der Küstentorpedoboote der A-Klassen (List of Coastal Torpedo-Boats of the A-Classes)

Notes

References

Bibliography 
 
 Robert Gardiner, editor, Conway's All The World's Fighting Ships 1906–1921. (London: Conway Maritime Press, 1985). 
 Erich Gröner, German Warships 1815–1945, Volume 1: Major Surface Vessels (London: Conway Maritime Press, 1990). 
 John C. Taylor, German Warships of World War I (London: Ian Allan Ltd., 1969).

External links
 High Seas Fleet Torpedoboats in: Michael Emmerich, German Naval History.
  in Ladislav Kosour, .